Fiji Hindi is an Indo-Aryan language spoken by Indo-Fijians. It is an Eastern Hindi and Bihari language, considered to be a koiné language based on Awadhi that has also been subject to considerable influence by Bhojpuri, other Eastern Hindi and Bihari dialects, and Standard Hindi-Urdu. It has also borrowed some words from English, Fijian, Tamil, Telugu, Bengali, Punjabi, and Gujarati. Many words unique to Fiji Hindi have been created to cater for the new environment that Indo-Fijians now live in. First-generation Indians in Fiji, who used the language as a lingua franca in Fiji, referred to it as Fiji Baat, "Fiji talk". It is closely related to Caribbean Hindustani and the Bhojpuri-Hindustani spoken in Mauritius and South Africa. It is largely mutually intellegible with the languages of Awadhi and Bhojpuri, as well as with the Bihari languages of Bihar, Uttar Pradesh, Jharkhand, Madhesh, Koshi and Lumbini, and the dialects of Eastern Hindi of Uttar Pradesh, Madhya Pradesh, Chhattisgarh and Lumbini, but differs in phonetics and vocabulary with Modern Standard Hindi and Urdu.

History 
These are the percentages of each language and dialect spoken by indentured labourers who came to Fiji.

Indian indentured labourers mainly spoke dialects from the Hindi Belt. Initially, the majority of labourers came to Fiji from districts of central and eastern Uttar Pradesh and Bihar, while a small percentage hailed from North-West Frontier and South India such as Andhra Pradesh and Tamil Nadu in the late 19th and early 20th centuries.

Over time, a distinct Indo-Aryan language with an Eastern Hindi substratum developed in Fiji, combining elements of the Hindi languages spoken in these areas with some native Fijian and English. The development of Fiji Hindi was accelerated by the need for labourers speaking different languages to work together and by the practice of leaving young children in early versions of day-care centers during working hours. Percy Wright, who lived in Fiji during the indenture period, wrote:

Other writers, including Burton (1914) and Lenwood (1917), made similar observations. By the late 1920s all Fiji Indian children born in Fiji learned Fiji Hindi, which became the common language in Fiji of North and South Indians alike.

Status

Later, approximately 15,000 Indian indentured labourers, who were mainly speakers of Dravidian languages (Tamil, Telugu, Tulu, Kannada and Malayalam), were brought from South India. By this time Fiji Hindi was well established as the lingua franca of Indo-Fijians and the Southern Indian labourers had to learn it to communicate with the more numerous Northern Indians and their European overseers. After the end of the indenture system, Indians who spoke Gujarati and Punjabi arrived in Fiji as free immigrants. A few Indo-Fijians speak Tamil, Telugu, and Gujarati at home, but all are fluently conversant and able to communicate using Fiji Hindi. The census reports of 1956 and 1966 shows the extent to which Fiji Hindi (referred to as 'Hindustani' in the census) was being spoken in Indo-Fijian households. Hindu schools teach the Devanagari script while the Muslim schools teach the Nastaliq script.

Fiji Hindi is also understood and even spoken by Indigenous Fijians in areas of Fiji where there are large Indo-Fijian communities. A pidgin form of the language is used by rural ethnic Fijians, as well as Chinese on the islands, while Pidgin Fijian is spoken by Indo-Fijians.

Following the recent political upheaval in Fiji, many Indo-Fijians have emigrated to Australia, New Zealand, Canada and the United States, where they have largely maintained their traditional Indo-Fijian culture, language, and religion.

Some writers have begun to use Fiji Hindi, until very recently a spoken language only, as a literary language. The Bible has now been translated into Fiji Hindi, and the University of the South Pacific has recently begun offering courses in the language. It is usually written in the Latin script though Devanāgarī has also been used.

A Fiji Hindi movie has also been produced depicting Indo-Fijian life and is based on a play by local playwright, Raymond Pillai.

Phonology 

The phonemes of Fiji Hindi are very similar to Standard Hindi, but there are some important distinctions. These features are common in the Eastern Hindi dialects.
Some other characteristics of Fiji Hindi which is similar to Bhojpuri and Awadhi are:
 Pronunciation of the vowels ai and au as diphthongs , rather than monophthongs  (as in standard Hindi). For example, bhauji (sister-in-law) and gaiya (cow).
 Coda clusters are removed with the use of epenthetic vowels. For example, dharm (religion) is pronounced as dharam.
 Shortening of long vowels before a stressed syllable. For example, Raajen (a common name) is pronounced as Rajen.

Pronouns

Morphology

Verb

Etymology
In Fiji Hindi verb forms have been influenced by a number of Hindi dialects in India. First and second person forms of verbs in Fiji Hindi are the same, there is no gender distinction and number distinction is only in the third person past tense. Although, gender is used in third person past tense by the usage of "raha" for a male versus "rahi" for a female.

The use of the first and second person imperfective suffixes -taa, -at are of Awadhi origin. 
Example: तुम मन्दिर जाता हैं / तुम मन्दिर जात हैं। "tum Mandir jaata hai/tum Mandir jaat hai." (You are going to the Temple).

While the third person imperfective suffix -e is of Bhojpuri origin. 
Example: ई बिल्ली मच्छरी खावे हैं। "Ee billi macchari KHAWE hai." (This cat is eating a fish).

The third person perfective suffixes (for transitive verbs) -is and -in are also derived from Awadhi. 
Example: किसान गन्ना काटीस रहा। "Kisaan ganna katees raha." (The farmer cut the sugarcane). 
पण्डित लोगन रामायण पढ़ीन रहा/पण्डित लोगन रामायण पढ़े रहीन। "Pandit logan Ramayan padheen raha/padhe raheen." (The priests read the Ramayana).

The third person definite future suffix -ii is found in both Awadhi and Bhojpuri. 
Example: प्रधानमंत्री हमलोग के पैसा दई। "Pradhanamantri humlog ke paisa daii" (The prime minister will give us money).

The influence of Hindustani is evident in the first and second person perfective suffix -aa and the first and second person future suffix -ega. 
Example: हम करा। तुम करेगा। "Hum karaa, tum karega." (I did, you will do).

The origin of the imperative suffix -o can be traced to the Magahi dialect. 
Example: तुम अपन मुह खोलो। "Tum apan muh khulo." (You open your mouth). Spoken in the Gaya and Patna districts, which provided a sizeable proportion of the first indentured labourers from Northern India to Fiji.

Fiji Hindi has developed its own polite imperative suffix -naa. 
Example: आप घर के सफा कर लेना। "Aap ghar ke sapha kar Lena." (You clean the house (polite)).

The suffix -be, from Bhojpuri, is used in Fiji Hindi in emphatic sentences.

Another suffix originating from Awadhi is -it. 
Example: ई लोगन पानी काहे नहीं पीत हैं। "Ee logan paani kahey nahi peet hai." (Why aren't these people drinking water?),
but is at present going out of use.

Tenses 

Fiji Hindi tenses are relatively similar to tenses in Standard Hindi. Bhojpuri and Awadhi influence the Fiji Hindi tenses.

Grammatical features 

 Fiji Hindi does not have plurals. For example, one house is ek gharr and two houses is dui gharr. In this example, the number is used to denote plurality. Plurals can also be stated with the use of log. For example, ee means "this person" (singular) and ee log means "these people" (plural). Sabb (all) and dHerr (many) are also used to denote plural. There are some exceptions, however. For example, a boy is larrka (single) but boys are larrkan (plural). Older generations still use a similar form of plural, for example, admian, for more than one man (singular: admi).
 There is no definite article ("the") in Fiji Hindi, but definite nouns can be made by adding the suffix wa; for example, larrka (a boy) and larrkwa (the boy). Definite nouns are also created using the suffix "kana"; for example, chhota (small) and chhotkana (the small one). Another way of indicating a definite article is by the use of pronouns: ii (this), uu (that) and wahii (the same one).

Fijian loan words 

Indo-Fijians now use native Fijian words for those things that were not found in their ancestral India but which existed in Fiji. These include most fish names and root crops. For example, kanade for mullet (fish) and kumaala for sweet potato or yam. Other examples are:

Words derived from English 

Many English words have also been borrowed into Fiji Hindi with sound changes to fit the Indo-Fijian pronunciation. For example, hutel in Fiji Hindi is borrowed from hotel in English. Some words borrowed from English have a specialised meaning, for example, garaund in Fiji Hindi means a playing field, geng in Fiji Hindi means a "work gang", particularly a cane-cutting gang in the sugar cane growing districts and tichaa in Fiji Hindi specifically means a female teacher. There are also unique Fijian Hindi words created from English words, for example, kantaap taken from cane-top means slap or associated with beating.

Semantic shifts

Indian languages 
Many words of Hindustani origin have shifted meaning in Fiji Hindi. These are due to either innovations in Fiji or continued use of the old meaning in Fiji Hindi when the word is either not used in Standard Hindi anymore or has evolved a different meaning altogether. Some examples are:

English 
Many words of English origin have shifted meaning in Fiji Hindi.

Counting 

Though broadly based on standard Hindi, counting in Fiji Hindi reflects a number of cross-language and dialectal influences acquired in the past 125 years.

The pronunciation for numbers between one and ten show slight inflections, seemingly inspired by Eastern Hindi dialects such as Bhojpuri.

Words for numbers between 10 and 99 present a significant difference between standard and Fiji Hindi. While, as in other north Indian languages, words for numbers in standard Hindustani are formed by mentioning units first and then multiples of ten, Fiji Hindi reverses the order and mentions the tens multiple first and the units next, as is the practice in many European and South-Indian languages.

Additionally, powers of ten beyond ten thousand, such as lakh (100,000) and crore (10 million), are not used in Fiji Hindi.

Spread overseas 

With political upheavals in Fiji, beginning with the first military coup in 1987, large numbers of Indo-Fijians have since migrated overseas and at present there are significant communities of Indo-Fijian expatriates in Australia, New Zealand, Canada and the United States. Smaller communities also reside on other Pacific Islands and Britain. The last census in each of the countries where Fiji Hindi is spoken (counting Indo-Fijians who were born in Fiji) provides the following figures:

Writers
 Rodney F. Moag, who had lived in India before joining the University of the South Pacific as a lecturer. He analysed Fiji Hindi and concluded that it was a unique language with its own distinct grammar, rather than "broken Hindi", as it had been previously referred to. Moag documented his findings and wrote lessons using the Fijian Hindi dialect in the book, Fiji Hindi: a basic course and reference grammar (1977).
 Jeff Siegel, in his thesis on Plantation languages in Fiji (1985), has written a detailed account of the development of Fiji Hindi and its different forms as used by Indo-Fijians and Indigenous Fijians. Earlier, Siegel had written a quick reference guide called Say it in Fiji Hindi (1976).
 Raman Subramani, professor in literature at the University of the South Pacific, who wrote the first Fiji Hindi novel, Duaka Puraan (Devanagari: डउका पुरान, 2001), which is the story of Fiji Lal (an old villager) as told by him to a visiting scholar to his village. The book is written in the style of the Puraans (sacred texts) but in a humorous way. He received a Government of India award for his contribution to Hindi language and literature for this novel. In June 2003, in Suriname at the Seventh World Hindi Conference, Professor Subramani was presented with a special award for this novel.
 Raymond C. Pillai wrote the story for the first Fiji Hindi movie, Adhura Sapna (Devanagari: अधूरा सपना, "Incomplete Dream"), produced in 2007.
 Urmila Prasad, who helped translate the Biblical Gospels of Mark, Luke, Matthew and John into Fiji Hindi, written using Roman script, known as Susamaachaar Aur Romiyo (2002)

See also 
 Girmityas, the descendants of late 18th and early 19th century labourers who were brought or emigrated to Fiji from India
 Hindustani language
 Caribbean Hindustani, a similar language developed under similar conditions in the Caribbean
 Sarnami, spoken by people of Indian origin in Suriname.
 Mauritian Bhojpuri, spoken by descendants of Girmityas in Mauritius. This is more like Bhojpuri because Mauritius' Indian population contains a larger number of those whose fore fathers came from the Bhojpuri speaking districts of India.

Footnotes

References

Bibliography 
 Siegel Jeff, Plantation Languages in Fiji, Australian National University, 1985 (Published as Language Contact in a Plantation Environment: A Sociolinguistic History of Fiji, Cambridge University Press, 1987, recently reprinted in paperback).

External links 

 Fiji Hindi Dictionary
 The first novel written in Fiji Hindi (archive link)
 Fiji Hindi version of the Gospels and Romans
 Adhura Sapna - Movie in Fiji Hindi
 Ghar Pardes - Another movie in Fiji Hindi, 2009
 Trailer of Ghar Pardes
 Fiji Hindi-to-Hindi Dictionary
 MyFijiGuide.com
 Fiji Hindi words on Wiktionary 
 Texan talks the talk (archived)
Fiji Hindi: A basic course and reference grammar.

Languages of Fiji
Hindi languages
Languages of the Indian diaspora
Indian diaspora in Fiji